"Round and Round" was the Prince-produced first single from R&B singer Tevin Campbell's debut album T.E.V.I.N. This was Tevin's first solo single, as he was featured in "Tomorrow (A Better You, A Better Me)" alongside music legend Quincy Jones. The song is also featured on the Graffiti Bridge soundtrack. The hit song was a success on both the pop and R&B charts peaking at No. 12 on the Hot 100 and No. 3 on the US R&B chart. Actress Brittany Murphy covered this song on the eighth season of Kids Incorporated as a duet with Nicole Brown.

Track listings
US Maxi-CD
 Round And Round (Single Version) 3:56
 Round And Round (Soul Mix Extended) 6:39
 Round And Round (The House) 7:32
 Round And Round (Soul Dub) 5:02

Europe CD
 Round And Round (Soul Mix Edit) 4:54
 Round And Round (The House) 7:30
 Goodbye (Tevin's Dub – Pt. 1&2) 6:53
 Goodbye (Siddub And Listen) 4:58

Charts

Weekly charts

Year-end charts

References

1990 singles
Tevin Campbell songs
Songs written by Prince (musician)
Music videos directed by Prince (musician)
Song recordings produced by Prince (musician)
1990 songs
Warner Records singles
Songs written for films